Lin Wang ( (original name), also called ), is a Chinese composer. Lin Wang was born in Dalian, China, in 1976.

Biography 
Lin Wang studied music composition at Central Conservatory of Music in Beijing (1996–2001). Later she studied composition and music theory at Hochschule für Musik Saar with Theo Brandmüller, and electronic music at IRCAM at the Centre Georges Pompidou in France. She also studied theatrical philosophy in music theater at University of Music and Performing Arts, Vienna, under Chaya Czernowin.

In 2008, her impromptu chamber ensemble JI LI GU LU was premiered at the 10th Munich Biennale. It was selected for performance again in the same year at the Biennale di Venezia and the Bregenz Festival. In 2010, her opera "Die Quelle" (The Source) was premiered at the 11th Munich Biennale. Lin Wang and Can Xue co-wrote the libretto. In this opera, drying and bubbling-up of the spring symbolize loss and regain of one's own identity. Chinese instruments Sheng, Guzheng and Sanxian were used in its music. An unusual feature is combination of English pronunciation and Chinese intonation in this opera. Her third opera "Oh, wie schön ist Panama!" (Oh, the Beautiful Panama!) was based on an illustrated children book  by Janosch. It was premiered at Deutsche Oper Berlin in 2013.

Awards

Lin Wang has won several international music composition competitions:
First Prize, Musica Femina München Komponistinnen entdecken und foerdern, Germany (2009).
First Prize, the first Edition of “Franco Donatoni ” International Meeting for Young Composers Composition Competition, International Society for Contemporary Music (ISCM), Italy (2008).
Grand Prize, the Isang Yun International Composition Prize, South Korea (2007).
First Prize, the First session of International Hamburg Klangwerktage New Musik Festival and Composition Competition, Germany (2006).
First Prize, European Young Composers Competition in Hochschule fuer Musik FRANZ LISZT Weimar, Germany (2005).
Special Prize and the Second Prize, the Luxembourg Sinfonietta on the Third Luxembourg International Composition Prize, Luxembourg (2004).

Selected works

References

External links

People's Republic of China composers
Musicians from Dalian
21st-century classical composers
Chinese women classical composers
1970s births
Living people
21st-century women composers